Socialist Equality Party (SEP) is a Trotskyist political party found in various nations, established under the umbrella of the International Committee of the Fourth International.

Socialist Equality Party (Australia)
Socialist Equality Party (Germany)
Socialist Equality Party (Sri Lanka)
Socialist Equality Party (UK)
Socialist Equality Party (United States)

See also
 Equality Party (disambiguation)
 Socialist Party (disambiguation)
 SEP (disambiguation)